Events from the year 1958 in Sweden

Incumbents
 Monarch – Gustaf VI Adolf 
 Prime Minister – Tage Erlander

Events

8-29 June – The 1958 FIFA World Cup is played in Sweden. Brazil defeats Sweden, 5–2, in the final game at Råsunda Stadium in Solna.

11 December – The first indoor ice hockey venue in Sweden, Rosenlundshallen in Jönköping, is inaugurated.

Births

 23 March – Bengt-Åke Gustafsson, ice hockey player and coach.
 16 August – Steve Sem-Sandberg, novelist.
 14 February – Birgitta Lillpers, poet.

Deaths
 11 September – Arvid Holmberg, gymnast (born 1886).
 23 September – Elisabeth Tamm, politician
 11 November – Helge Bäckander, gymnast (born 1891).
 Anna Lisa Andersson, reporter (born 1873)

See also
 1958 in Swedish television

References

External links

 
Sweden
Years of the 20th century in Sweden